Biankouri  is a small town in the Savanes Region of north-western Togo. It is located 82 kilometres from Dapaong.

Populated places in Savanes Region, Togo